Zubaid Akbari (born 1 May 2000) is an Afghan cricketer. He made his first-class debut for Speen Ghar Region in the 2018 Ahmad Shah Abdali 4-day Tournament on 22 April 2018. He made his List A debut for Nangarhar Province in the 2019 Afghanistan Provincial Challenge Cup tournament on 31 July 2019. He made his Twenty20 debut on 7 September 2020, for Speen Ghar Tigers in the 2020 Shpageeza Cricket League. On his Twenty20 debut, he scored a half-century in the match.

References

External links
 

2000 births
Living people
Afghan cricketers
Spin Ghar Tigers cricketers